Chantal Botts (born 30 March 1976) is a South African badminton player. Botts was the gold medallist in the women's doubles event at the 2003 and 2007 All-Africa Games. She represented South Africa at the 2004 and 2008 Olympic Games partnered with Michelle Edwards.

Achievements

All Africa Games 
Women's singles

Women's doubles

African  Championships 
Women's singles

Women's doubles

Mixed doubles

BWF International Challenge/Series 
Women's singles

Women's doubles

Mixed doubles

  BWF International Challenge tournament

  BWF International Series tournament
  BWF Future Series tournament

References

External links 
 
 
 
 

1976 births
Living people
People from Witbank
South African female badminton players
Badminton players at the 2004 Summer Olympics
Badminton players at the 2008 Summer Olympics
Olympic badminton players of South Africa
Competitors at the 2003 All-Africa Games
Competitors at the 2007 All-Africa Games
African Games gold medalists for South Africa
African Games silver medalists for South Africa
African Games bronze medalists for South Africa
African Games medalists in badminton
20th-century South African women
21st-century South African women